The 2015–16 Slovenian Football Cup was the 25th season of the Slovenian Football Cup, Slovenia's football knockout competition. Koper were the defending champions, having won their third cup title in the 2014–15 edition.

Competition format

Qualified teams

2014–15 Slovenian PrvaLiga members
Celje
Domžale
Gorica
Koper
Krka
Maribor
Olimpija
Radomlje
Rudar Velenje
Zavrč

Qualified through MNZ Regional Cups
2014–15 MNZ Celje Cup: Šampion and Rogaška
2014–15 MNZ Koper Cup: Ankaran Hrvatini and Izola
2014–15 MNZG-Kranj Cup: Triglav Kranj and Zarica Kranj
2014–15 MNZ Lendava Cup: Odranci and Hotiza
2014–15 MNZ Ljubljana Cup: Ivančna Gorica and Ilirija 1911
2014–15 MNZ Maribor Cup: Fužinar and Pesnica
2014–15 MNZ Murska Sobota Cup: Veržej and Mura
2014–15 MNZ Nova Gorica Cup: Brda and Tolmin
2014–15 MNZ Ptuj Cup: Drava Ptuj and Stojnci

Bracket

First round
Slovenian PrvaLiga clubs Celje, Domžale, Koper and Maribor joined the competition in the second round (round of 16).

Notes

Round of 16
The draw for the round of 16 was held on 21 August 2015 at the headquarters of the Football Association of Slovenia in Ljubljana. In this phase of the competition, the twelve clubs who advanced from the first round were joined by Celje, Domžale, Koper and Maribor.

Quarter-finals
The draw of pairs was held on 18 September 2015 at the headquarters of the Football Association of Slovenia in Ljubljana.

First leg

Second leg

Semi-finals
The draw of pairs was held on 18 January 2016 at the headquarters of the Football Association of Slovenia.

First leg

Second leg

Final

References
General

Specific

Slovenian Football Cup seasons
Cup
Slovenia